The South Alberta Regiment (SAR) was a regiment of the Canadian Army that existed from 1924 to 1954. Originally infantry, in February 1942 it became an armoured unit. During World War II the Regiment fought from July 1944 to May 1945 in France, Belgium, the Netherlands, and Germany.

History

Early History 
The regiment was created in 1924 as infantry after The Alberta Regiment was split into two separate regiments: The North Alberta Regiment (disbanded in 1936) and The South Alberta Regiment.

Second World War 
The South Alberta Regiment mobilized in 1940 as part of the 4th Canadian Infantry Division. When the division was reorganized as an armoured formation to satisfy demand for a second Canadian armoured division, the South Alberta Regiment was named 29th Armoured Regiment (The South Alberta Regiment) and received Ram tanks in February 1942. The unit was again renamed as 29th Armoured Reconnaissance Regiment (The South Alberta Regiment) in January 1943.

The SAR was deployed to northern France in mid-June 1944 (Normandy landings, D-Day was 6 June 1944), replacing their Ram tanks to be equipped with Stuart and Sherman tanks. They participated in the later battles of the Invasion of Normandy, taking part in Operation Totalize and finally closing the Falaise pocket in Operation Tractable. The South Albertas went on to participate in the liberation of the Netherlands and the Battle of the Scheldt. 

In January 1945, they took part in the Battle for the Kapelsche Veer. They spent the last weeks of the war fighting in northern Germany.

Major David Vivian Currie of the SAR received the Victoria Cross for his actions near Saint-Lambert-sur-Dives, as the allies attempted to seal off the Falaise pocket. Currie was one of only 16 Canadians to receive the Victoria Cross during World War II. It was the only Victoria Cross awarded to a Canadian soldier during the Normandy campaign, and the only Victoria Cross ever awarded to a member of the Royal Canadian Armoured Corps. Lieutenant Donald I. Grant took a photograph of the event that would become one of the most famous images of the War (see at right). Historian C. P. Stacey called it "as close as we are ever likely to come to a photograph of a man winning the Victoria Cross."

The Freedom of the City was exercised by the South Alberta Regiment in Nanaimo, British Columbia, in April, 1941.

The SAR is now incorporated by amalgamation in the reserve reconnaissance regiment the South Alberta Light Horse.

Perpetuations

The Great War 

 31st Battalion (Alberta), CEF
 113th Battalion (Lethbridge Highlanders), CEF
 175th (Medicine Hat) Battalion, CEF
 187th (Central Alberta) Battalion, CEF

Lineage 
The South Alberta Regiment descended from the Calgary Rifles, which had been raised in 1910. In 1920 the Rifles split into two new regiments, the Calgary Regiment and the Alberta Regiment. In 1924 the Alberta Regiment again divided, forming the South Alberta Regiment and the North Alberta Regiment. The North Albertas disbanded in 1936 while the South Albertas continued through World War II.

Battle Honours

Great War 

 Mount Sorrel
 Somme, 1916, '18
 Flers–Courcelette
 Thiepval
 Ancre Heights
 Ancre, 1916
 Arras, 1917, '18
 Vimy, 1917
 Arleux
 Scarpe, 1917, '18
 Hill 70
 Ypres, 1917
 Passchendaele
 Amiens
 Drocourt–Quéant
 Hindenburg Line
 Canal du Nord
 Cambrai, 1918
 Pursuit to Mons
 France and Flanders, 1915–18

Second World War 

 Falaise
 Falaise Road
 The Laison
 St Lambert-sur-Dives
 Moerbrugge
 The Scheldt
 Woensdrecht
 The Lower Maas
 Kapelsche Veer
 The Rhineland
 The Hochwald
 Veen
 Twente Canal
 Bad Zwischenahn
 North-West Europe, 1944–1945

External links
 South Alberta Regiment Veterans Association

Notes and references

Infantry regiments of Canada
Armoured regiments of Canada
Regiments of Canada in World War II
Military units and formations of Alberta
South Alberta Light Horse
South Alberta Regiment